Monica Ramon (born April 27, 1981 as Monica Vila) is a Spanish-American actress who first began appearing in film, television and stage productions in her native Spain in the mid-1990s.  Her glamorous looks and style are evocative of the Golden Age of Hollywood.  She is the granddaughter of the celebrated Spanish artist Lluis Vila Plana, a period contemporary of Pablo Picasso.

Biography

Early life 

Monica Ramon was born in the Sabadell section of Barcelona, Spain.  She is the daughter of Anna Vila Alia and Jacint Ramoneda Badiella.  The family lived in five different houses during Monica's childhood.  Eventually the family settled in the seaside town of Tossa de Mar, the same town where Ava Gardner starred in the film, Pandora and the Flying Dutchman.  When she was 18 years old her parents divorced and her father remarried. She lived with her grandmother during four years. Throughout her life Monica has always been very active and was heavily involved with sports as a child, including running and swimming.  She comes from a very artistic family and was inspired to art as a child by her grandfather's work.  She studied theater and ballet as a child and as a young woman she studied theater, art history and plastic arts in Barcelona.  Regionally she identifies herself with the Catalan culture and speaks the native Catalan language.

She moved to Los Angeles, California in 2006 to pursue her acting career.  At that time she became a vegetarian.

Acting career 

Monica's first acting role was in the Spanish television series Happy End (1997), working alongside the marquee Spanish actress Monica Lopez, playing the role of Malvada.  Later that same year she was featured in the Spanish feature film, Primats, working with the renowned Spanish director Carlos Jover.

Monica went on to study acting at the Chekov Theater in Madrid. She left Barcelona for Madrid in 2000 by herself and spent four years studying and acting on stage.  Her studies included the Stanislavsky Method under acting coach Angel Gutierrez.  During that period of time she established herself as a serious stage actress and developed an impressive stage resume, including winning a best actress stage award for work in a Tennessee Williams play at the Karpas Theater as a part of the Trapola theater company.

Recent success 

Monica came to the United States in 2006 and immediately found work in several television shows and film productions as well as T.V. commercials in the Los Angeles area.  2008 will be remembered as a banner year for Miss Ramon, having been cast in roles in four films - Dirty Girl, XII, Polanski and Mexican Gangster in the first half of the year alone.

On her listing on   IMDB.com, she is credited with appearing in the film Full Moon Rising in 1996 in California, during a time when she had not yet left Spain for California.  The date listed on the website is incorrect. The actual date of the film was 2006.

So far in her career Monica has had the opportunity to work with such actors as Robert De Niro and Steven Bauer, and directors Michael A. Nickles and Damian Chapa.

Personal life 

Monica has remained single, though she had long-term, live-in relationship with Giuseppe Ferraro 2000/2005 in Madrid Spain.  In 2004 she purchased a house in Madrid on her own.  She has two younger brothers, twins named David and Albert, whom she loves as if they were her own children.  In the same year their parents divorced, the two brothers were involved in a near-fatal car accident.  Albert, who had been ejected from the car, was seriously injured and his brother David performed CPR and saved his brother's life.  Albert then spent a long rehabilitation learning to walk and talk again.  He subsequently  fell into alcoholism and sought treatment.  He is now an alcohol dependence counselor, helping others who have fallen prey to alcohol addiction.

Monica Ramon lists her religion as Buddhist.  Monica considers herself to be a strong woman with a great sense of humor.  She believes that anything is possible with the right positive attitude. She says "What we think we become".

Filmography and television 
2015
A beautiful Soul Imdb

References

External links 
NY Times Movie Listing for Monica Ramon
Pictures of Monica Ramon at CelebrityPhoto.com
  www.dailyceleb.com Monica Ramon
  www.realtvfilms.com Monica Ramon
  www.hollywood.com Monica Ramon

1976 births
American film actresses
Living people
American people of Catalan descent
American Buddhists
American television actresses
Actresses from Los Angeles
Actresses from Barcelona
Spanish emigrants to the United States
21st-century American women